Maria Liliana Olivero (born 20 January 1956) is a former member of the provincial legislature in Córdoba Province, Argentina.

She is a member of the Socialist Left (Argentina).

She was elected in 2003, and re-elected in 2007 and 2011, the last time as a candidate of the Workers' Left Front.

She was the Front's no. 1 candidate for Córdoba Province in the 2013 Argentine legislative election.  She only missed election narrowly, and there was a dispute over the result.

In December 2013 she stood down as a provincial deputy, under the agreement to rotate the Front's seats, and handed over to Cintia Frencia.

She is a child psychologist, and has two children.

External links 
brief biography (Spanish)
report on her election in 2011 (Spanish)
her blog (Spanish)
announcement of 2013 candidature (Spanish)

Living people
Socialist Left (Argentina) politicians
21st-century Argentine women politicians
21st-century Argentine politicians
People from Córdoba Province, Argentina
Child psychologists
1956 births